Nordinone (INN), also known as 11α-hydroxy-17,17-dimethyl-18-norandrosta-4,13-dien-3-one, is a naturally occurring steroid with antiandrogen properties isolated as a metabolite from the fungus Monocillium nordinii.

References

Steroids
Steroidal antiandrogens